Pleasanton is a census-designated place in the Williams Valley of Catron County, south of Glenwood and north of Cliff, in the U.S. state of New Mexico. As of the 2010 census it had a population of 106. It was renowned as a safehaven for Mormon polygamists for several years.

Demographics

History
Pleasanton was founded by Mormons in 1882. The 24th child of Mormon polygamist Jacob Hamblin was born there in 1884. Hamblin died of malarial fever in 1886. Other polygamists, including William Maxwell, made their home in Pleasanton specifically to evade the law.

In 1885 a band of Chiricahua Apache killed a group of U.S. Army soldiers in a triple cross-fire trap near Pleasanton.

Education
It is in the Reserve Independent School District.

See also
 Mormon Corridor

References

Census-designated places in Catron County, New Mexico
Populated places established in 1882
1882 establishments in New Mexico Territory
Census-designated places in New Mexico